Billie Untermann (1906 – 1973) was a geologist who had a significant contribution to the understanding and recognition of the Uintah Basin. She was the single author of the text "The Uinta Basin—Past and Present."  This text highlighted the history of the Uinta Basin, which is a stretch of land in Utah which was first colonized 15,000-20,000 years ago. She received her B.A. in Geology (1929) and later an M.A.(1934) at the University of California (1934). She discovered and assembled many dinosaur skeletons, which were a popular attraction at the Utah Field House of Natural History, to which she was a museum technician. She eventually become its director.

Along with her husband Ernest Untermann they published a popular text "Geology of Dinosaur National Monument". 
Her works were instrumental in fostering tourism in Vernal.

References  

American women geologists
20th-century American geologists
1906 births
1973 deaths
Place of birth missing
20th-century American women scientists
University of California alumni